Joseph Tony Serra (born December 30, 1934) is an American civil rights attorney, activist and tax resister from San Francisco.

Early life and education

A San Francisco native, Serra was raised in the Outer Sunset district. His father, Anthony Serra, was an immigrant from Mallorca who worked in a jelly bean factory, and his mother, Gladys (Fineberg) Serra, was a Los Angeles-born Russian Jewish immigrant from Odessa; she died by suicide in 1979.

Serra earned a Bachelor of Arts degree in Philosophy from Stanford University and a Juris Doctor degree from Boalt Hall at the University of California, Berkeley. While in law school, Serra was a contributor to the California Law Review.

Career
In 1970, Serra successfully defended Black Panther leader Huey Newton in a murder trial.

In 1983, Serra won an acquittal for Chol Soo Lee, a Korean American immigrant in San Francisco who had been convicted of murder in 1973 and sentenced to life imprisonment.

He has also represented individuals from groups as diverse and politically-charged as the White Panthers, Hells Angels, Good Earth and New World Liberation Front (NWLF). Some of these individuals include Brownie Mary, Dennis Peron, Hooty Croy, Ellie Nesler and Symbionese Liberation Army members Sara Jane Olson, Russell Little and Michael Bortin.

In 2003, Serra was awarded the Trial Lawyer of the Year award by the organization Trial Lawyers for Public Justice for his successful litigation of Judi Bari against the FBI.

In 2004, Serra won an acquittal during a retrial on murder charges for co-defendant Rick Tabish in the death of casino mogul Ted Binion.

In 2015, he defended Chinatown crime boss Raymond "Shrimp Boy" Chow.

Tax resistance
Serra has been in trouble with the law several times for failure to pay income taxes. He refused to pay taxes in protest of the War in Iraq based on his conviction that the Bush administration was leading the country in the wrong direction and that he would, therefore, not contribute any money to fund what he saw as Bush's corrupt politics. On July 29, 2005, he was sentenced to 10 months in federal prison, to be served at Lompoc, California, and ordered to pay $100,000 in restitution for a misdemeanor conviction of willful failure to pay taxes. In 2006, Ephraim Margolin and Douglas L. Rappaport represented Serra against the State Bar of California when he faced action for failing to file a tax return. His license to practice law in California was suspended for one year, and he was placed on a probationary period for two years.  Serra was released from the federal camp in February 2007, reporting immediately to a San Francisco halfway house. He was released from federal custody, and the halfway house, on March 13, 2007 after serving out his sentence. Along with three other attorneys, Serra filed a class-action lawsuit seeking minimum wages for himself and for other inmates, citing slave wages as unconstitutional.

Personal life and family
Serra has taken a vow of poverty and is known for living a frugal lifestyle and driving a run-down car. He does not have a cell phone, a bank account or a credit card. In a disciplinary hearing before the State Bar of California, Serra stated, "I took an informal vow of poverty. I vowed that I would never take profit from the practice of law, that I would not buy anything new, that I would recycle everything, that I would own no properties - no stocks or bonds, no images of prosperity. I still drive an old junk of a car. I still barely make the rent each month; I have accumulated nothing by way of savings, and I live from hand to mouth."

All income from his cases is distributed to other attorneys except for a very small portion that he uses to pay for his rent and for gas for his car.

Serra has five children with Mary Edna Dineen: Shelter, Ivory, Chime Day, Wonder Fortune and Lilac Bright. Dineen raised all five of them in a home in Bolinas, California that Serra called a "sprawling shack."

Serra has two younger brothers: Richard Serra, a prominent sculptor, and Rudy Serra, also a noted artist. Richard paid for the college educations of Serra's five children.

In popular culture
The 1989 film True Believer was loosely based on the 1982-83 retrial of Chol Soo Lee. The film's main character, Eddie Dodd, played by James Woods, is based on Serra.

The film inspired a spin-off series, Eddie Dodd, which ran for six episodes in 1991 on ABC; Dodd was played by Treat Williams.

A biography of Serra, Lust for Justice: The Radical Life and Law of J. Tony Serra, written by courtroom artist Paulette Frankl and with a foreword by criminal defense attorney Gerry Spence, was released in October 2010.

High-profile cases

 Huey Newton
 Black Panthers
 White Panthers
 Russell Little, Symbionese Liberation Army
 New World Liberation Front
 Hells Angels Leader George Christie
 Chol Soo Lee
 Hooty Croy
 Brownie Mary
 Ellie Nesler
 Raymond "Shrimp Boy" Chow<ref name=NYTM101315>{{cite news|author1=Elizabeth Weil|title=Shrimp Boy's Day in Court What happened when one of San Francisco's most notorious underworld bosses tried to go clean.|url=https://www.nytimes.com/2015/10/18/magazine/shrimp-boys-day-in-court.html|access-date=October 14, 2015|work=The New York Times Magazine|date=October 13, 2015|quote=For Serra, representing Shrimp Boy is an honor and a privilege. This is the type of case that any politically inclined lawyer — this is your holy grail, he said. This is a government-created crime.}}</ref>
 Bear Lincoln
 Sara Jane Olson, Symbionese Liberation Army
 Judi Bari and Darryl Cherney v. FBI
 Michael Bortin, Symbionese Liberation Army
 Rick Tabish, Las Vegas Ted Binion case
 Rod Coronado, Earth Liberation Front
 BALCO, Barry Bonds's trainer Greg Anderson
 Jing Hua Wu, SiPort shooting
 Derick Almena, Ghost Ship warehouse fire

Awards
Runner up, "Best Lawyer in America," American Lawyer magazine, 1982
Drug Policy Foundation Achievement in the Field of Law, 1992
Boalt Hall "Alumnus of the Year", 1993
Charles Garry Award, 1994
ACLU Benjamin Dreyfus Civil Liberties Award, 1997
California Attorneys for Criminal Justice, 2000, "Ten Best Criminal Defense Attorneys of the Century"
McFetridge-American Inn of court, Co-Awardee "2003 Trial Lawyer of the Year"
Trial Lawyers for Public Justice,"Certificate of Honor, December 1, 2005"
Criminal Trial Lawyers Association of Northern California,"2005 Gideon Equal Justice Award"
2008 NORML Lester Grinspoon Award,"For Outstanding Achievement in the Field of Marijuana Law Reform"

References

External links

“Letter from Prison” California LawyerThe Believer Behind Bars San Francisco November 2006
Always a Man of His Convictions Los Angeles Times 7 August 2005
Tax Evasion Sends Renowned Attorney to Prison — Again The Recorder 1 August 2005
J. Tony Serra — Pier 5 Law Offices
Dream Team Shattered Las Vegas CityLife 6 June 2004, by Cathy Scott
J. Tony Serra: The War Tax Resisting Attorney More Than a Paycheck'' August 2007
Tony Serra on War Tax Resistance and Doing Time (video of him speaking at a National War Tax Resistance Coordinating Committee conference)
 a video by Paper Tiger TV West featuring Tony Serra critiquing the Bush era "War on Drugs" and early "Reality TV"

American tax resisters
American people convicted of tax crimes
Living people
California lawyers
Criminal defense lawyers
People from Marin County, California
People from San Francisco
Stanford University alumni
1934 births
Law in the San Francisco Bay Area
UC Berkeley School of Law alumni